Forevergreen may refer to

Forevergreen (Elfquest) a forest in Elfquest
, a Singaporean cargo ship in service 1977-78
 Forevergreen, a single released in 1992 by the band Finitribe.